The 1989 Open Clarins was a women's tennis tournament played on outdoor clay courts at the Racing Club de France in Paris, France, and was part of the Category 2 tier of the 1989 WTA Tour. It was the third edition of the tournament and was held from 18 September until 24 September 1989. Fourth-seeded Sandra Cecchini won the singles title and earned $17,000 first-prize money.

Finals

Singles
 Sandra Cecchini defeated  Regina Rajchrtová 6–4, 6–7(5–7), 6–1
 It was Cecchini's only title of the year and the 9th of her career.

Doubles
 Sandra Cecchini /  Patricia Tarabini defeated  Nathalie Herreman /  Catherine Suire 6–1, 6–1

References

External links
 ITF tournament edition details
 Tournament draws

Open Clarins
Clarins Open
1989 in Paris
1989 in French tennis